Semir is the Turkish and Bosnian form of the Arabic given name Samir. Its corresponding feminine form is Semira or Semire. It may refer to:
 Semir Ben-Amor, a Finnish professional ice hockey player
 Semir Bajraktarević (born 1987), a Bosnian footballer
 Semir Hadžibulić (born 1986), a Serbian-born Bosniak footballer
 Semir Kerla (born 1987), a Bosnian footballer
 Semir Osmanagić (born 1960), an author
 Semir Pepic (born 1972), an Australian judoka
 Semir Slomić (born 1988), a Bosnian footballer
 Semir Štilić (born 1987), a Bosnian footballer
 Semir Tuce (born 1964), a footballer
 Semir Zeki, a professor of neuroesthetics at University College London
 Semir Bingngwamnumbwie man Who was King